Chèvreville may refer to several communes in France:

Chèvreville, Manche, in the Manche département 
Chèvreville, Oise, in the Oise département